The Toyota K series is an inline-four engine that was produced from 1966 through 2007. It is a two-valve pushrod engine design. It was originally built from the Toyota Kamigo plant in Toyota City factory in Japan.

All K series are non-crossflow engines – the inlet and exhaust manifolds are on the same side. They have cast iron blocks and aluminium alloy heads, with a crankshaft supported by five main bearings. K series motors have both hydraulic tappet or hydraulic valve lifters, solid lifters and 1.5 ratio rockers with an adjustment thread for tappet clearance. 7k engines were released with only the hydraulic valve lifters from factory, whereas 4k and 5k engines were made with both hydraulic and solid lifters (depending on year and which model vehicle.)

K

The 8-valve OHV  K was produced from 1966 through 1969. A similar K-B was produced from 1968 through 1969, the -B designates twin carburettors. Thus equipped, the engine produces  at 6600 rpm. The Publica SL received this more powerful version.

Applications:
 Toyota Corolla (KE1x)
 Toyota Publica (KP3x)

2K
The eight-valve OHV  2K was produced from 1969 through 1988.

Applications:
 Toyota Publica/1000 (KP30/KP36)
 Toyota Starlet

3K

The eight-valve overhead valve  3K was produced from 1969 through 1977.

The 1969 through 1975 3K-B was a twin-carburetor version. The California-spec 3K-C (1977–1979) and 3K-H were other available versions.

Applications
 Toyota Corolla
 Toyota Kijang/first generation Toyota Tamaraw
 Toyota LiteAce (KM10)
 Toyota Publica (later pickups and vans received the desmogged 3K-HJ engine)
 Toyota Starlet
 Toyota TownAce (KR10)
 Daihatsu Charmant (A10)
 Daihatsu Delta 750 (KB10)

Specifications

4K

The  4K was produced from 1977 through 1989. It was an 8-valve OHV engine.

In 1980, the 4K produced  at 5250 rpm.

Available in hydraulic and solid lifter configurations

Applications:
 Toyota Corolla
 Toyota Kijang
 Toyota Liteace
 Toyota Starlet
 Daihatsu Charmant
 1977–1979 Daihatsu Delta 750 (KD11)

5K

The  5K was produced from 1983 through 1996. It was available with either 4- or 5-speed manual transmissions. Like the smaller 4K model, it uses hydraulic lifters as well as solid lifters for the pushrod.

Applications:
 1983.08-1987.10 Toyota Carina Van (KA67V 'Van') 5K-J
 1983.05-1987.08 Toyota Corolla Van (KE74V) 5K-J
 1983.10-1987.12 Toyota Corona Van (KT147V 'Van') 5K-J,  at 5,200 rpm
 Toyota Liteace KR27 Van
 Toyota Liteace KM36 Van  at 4800 rpm,  at 3200 rpm
 Toyota Kijang/Tamaraw
 Toyota TownAce KR41 Van
Toyota Forklift (late 1980s-early 1990s model)

7K

The  7K was first introduced in 1983.
The Engine was available with a 5 speed manual & 4 speed automatic transmission. Available in both fuel injected and carburetted configurations, the 7K produces much more power and torque compared to the other K engines however it is a lot less 'rev happy' due to having such a long stroke.

7K-E is available in KR42 Townace SBV vans (1997–2007) using a large G52 5 speed gearbox (same bellhousing to box pattern as W55), or automatic.

Applications:
 Toyota Kijang/Tamaraw FX/Revo
 Toyota LiteAce/TownAce

References

See also
 List of Toyota engines
 Toyota K transmission

K
Straight-four engines
Gasoline engines by model